Pamali is a village located in the Ludhiana West tehsil, of Ludhiana district, Punjab.

Administration
The village is administrated by a Sarpanch Sukhwinder Singh Gollu elected 2018 for 5 years who is an elected representative of village as per constitution of India and Panchayati raj (India).

Villages in Ludhiana West Tehsil

Air travel connectivity 
The closest airport to the village is Sahnewal Airport.

References

Famous People Com Sukhwinder Singh Sekhon
Famous Singer Mani Manraj Pamali Wala
Famous Punjabi Movie Rupinder Gandhi The Gangster Also Shoot in Pamali
Movie of Salman Khan Bharat 2019 also shoot here

Villages in Ludhiana West tehsil